Gowdal (also Romanized as Gowdāl and Gūdal) is a village in Sumay-ye Jonubi Rural District, Sumay-ye Beradust District, Urmia County, West Azerbaijan Province, Iran. At the 2006 census, its population was 99, in 18 families.

References 

Populated places in Urmia County